The 1968 Sam Houston State Bearkats football team represented Sam Houston State College (now known as Sam Houston State University) as a member of the Lone Star Conference (LSC) during the 1968 NAIA football season. Led by first-year head coach Tom Page, the Bearkats compiled an overall record of 5–4–1 with a mark of 3–3–1 in conference play, and finished fourth in the LSC. After he served as an assistant coach for the Bearkats for a decade, Page was promoted to head coach in December 1967 after Paul Pierce resigned to take a full-time faculty position.

Schedule

References

Sam Houston State
Sam Houston Bearkats football seasons
Sam Houston State Bearkats football